József Szabó (born 31 January 1956) is a retired Hungarian footballer who played as a centre forward.

References

External links
 

1956 births
Living people
Sportspeople from Komárom-Esztergom County
Hungarian footballers
Association football forwards
Nemzeti Bajnokság I players
Fehérvár FC players
Iraklis Thessaloniki F.C. players
Fehérvár FC managers
Hungarian expatriate footballers
Hungarian expatriate sportspeople in Greece
Hungarian expatriate sportspeople in Austria
Hungarian football managers